China Renaissance is a Chinese financial institution. Founded by Fan Bao in 2005 as a financial advisory firm, China Renaissance’s core business now consists of investment banking, investment management and wealth management. As of June 30, 2020, China Renaissance had advised on approximately 980 transactions worth over USD$146 billion since its inception, and the company’s private equity funds had AUM of approximately RMB39.0 billion in new economy investments.

The chairman and CEO is Fan Bao. The group has offices in Beijing, Shanghai, Hong Kong and New York.

China Renaissance was listed on the Main Board of Hong Kong Stock Exchange in 2018 (stock code: 1911.HK)

Core Businesses

Investment Banking Business 

China Renaissance provides a full suite of investment banking services, including early-stage services, advisory services, equity underwriting, sales, trading brokerage, and research. 

China Renaissance advised in numerous private placement and M&A transactions for Chinese New Economy companies, including Tencent, Alibaba, Baidu, JD.com, Kuaishou, Meituan, Didi Chuxing, Grab, MGI Tech, MissFresh, Zhihu. 

China Renaissance is one of the few China-based financial institutions that is licensed to offer underwriting services in mainland China, Hong Kong and the United States. The group began underwriting services in 2012. As of 28 February 2021, it has supported a number of industry-leading companies in initial public offering (“IPO”) deals, including China Literature, YY, iQiyi, ZTO Express, LexinFintech, Maoyan Entertainment, JD.com, JD Health, Pinduoduo, KE Holdings, Kuaishou Technology, Pop Mart, Lufax, Yetsen Global, China Data Group, I-MAB, TCR² Therapeutics, JHBP and Strawbear Entertainment. 

Huaxing Securities is a Mainland China-focused investment banking subsidiary that is licensed to provide securities underwriting, securities brokerage, research, and asset management services. It was established in 2016 as “Huajing Securities” and re-branded as “Huaxing Securities” in December 2020. Huaxing Securities was among the first batch of underwriters for STAR IPOS as it served as the joint-sponsor and the lead underwriter of Endovastec IPO on 22 June 2019.

Investment Management Business  

China Renaissance launched its private equity investment management business in 2013. By the end of 2020, the group runs seven private equity funds under Huaxing Growth Capital and Huaxing Healthcare Capital. In September 2020, Huaxing Growth Capital, China Renaissance’s investment flagship closed its third USD-denominated fund with over $600 million in committed capital, bring the group’s total AUM to RMB39 billion.  

By the end of 2020, China Renaissance has invested in over 100 new economy entrepreneurs and home-grown companies over the past seven years and has helped over 30 of these firms go public in China and international markets. Its private equity funds recorded an average multiple of invested capital (MOIC) of 2.5x and internal rate of return (IRR) of 33 per cent as of June 30, 2020. The portfolio companies of Huaxing Growth Capital include Pop Mart, Kuaishou Technology, Beike Zhaofang(Lianjia),   Jiangxiaobai, Didi Chuxing, Meituan, Li Auto, WuXi AppTec, MININGLAMP Technology, Focus Media, LEXIN and Micro-Tech Endoscopy.

Wealth Management Business  

China Renaissance started the Wealth Management business in 2019. The Wealth Management business provides value-added wealth management services for high net-worth individuals and other high net worth groups represented by new-economy entrepreneurs. As of 30 June 2019, the group’s wealth management business had an existing AUM of RMB2.6 billion.

Awards

In February 2016, received FinanceAsia Achievement Awards for "Best China Deal" and "Best Private Equity Deal". The "Best China Deal" was for its role as the financial advisor for Meituan and Dianping's "strategic cooperation". Meituan-Dianping is China's largest group deals website, and in January 2016 it closed a $3.3 billion funding round, valuing the merged company at $18 billion. The company claims that this is China's largest ever funding round for a venture-backed Internet startup.

In 2020, China Renaissance received FinanceAsia Achievement Awards “Best Equity Deal of the Year” and “BEST OF CHINA/HONG KONG” by serving as Joint Global Co-ordinator for JD.com’s HK$34.56 billion ($4.46 billion) Hong Kong secondary listing. 

In 2020, China Renaissance received  five awards from The Asset Triple A Awards, including “Best anti-COVID-19 deal” by serving as exclusive financial advisor for MGI Tech’s US$1 billion Series B financing ; “Best Equity Deal” by serving as Joint Global Co-ordinator for JD.com’s US$3.9 billion secondary listing; “Best Domestic M&A” awards by serving as the exclusive financial adviser for GOME’s strategic cooperation with Pinduoduo and JD.com; “Best ADR” for serving as underwriter for Chindata Group Holdings’ US$756 million US IPO and private placement; “Best IPO” for serving as financial adviser and global coordinator for JD Health International’s US$3.48 billion IPO.

References

External links

Companies listed on the Hong Kong Stock Exchange
2005 establishments in China
Investment banks in China